Dario Straschnoy is an Argentine communications executive, Chairman of Untold and CEO of The Juju. He is recognized for his work as President and partner of Young & Rubicam's Argentine office.

Early career 
Dario Straschnoy began his advertising career after studying Psychology at Buenos Aires University. At the end of high school, he worked at his father's glassware and when he was 20 years old, he began his own business:  publishing classified ads.

Young & Rubicam 

In 1988, when he was part of the Funes, Straschnoy & Dreyfus agency, he partnered with Young & Rubicam and assumed the presidency of the group.

Under the leadership of Straschnoy, Young & Rubicam won awards at the major festivals worldwide, including more than twenty-five Cannes Lions, and eleven Martín Fierro awards in the 'Best Advertising Notice' shortlist .

In 2012 and 2013, it was chosen as the best advertising agency of the year in the Jerry Goldenberg Awards for Excellence in Communications and in 2011 it was the most awarded in Effie Awards.

Under Straschnoy's leadership, the agency won twenty ‘Lápiz de Platino’, seven of them were in the TV category, five of which were for best agency.

They have more than fifty awards in different festivals such as Clio Awards, Wave Rio, San Sebastian, FIAP, Buenos Anuncios, Clarin Awards (Grand Prix), El Ojo de Iberoamerica, The Sun, New York and London Festival, among others.

The agency also ranked first in the Global Ranking of Advertising Agencies, whose name is AgencyScope, which is conducted by the Spanish Consulting Group.

In the end of 2013, he left the group.

Untold_ 
In early 2014, he founded the advertising agency Carlos y Darío, along with publicist Carlos Baccetti. Soon after, he created Agora, which is a public affairs & strategic communications agency, and Fogdog, a brand insight consultancy. Together, the three companies constitute Untold, a communications' professionals ecosystem.   The ecosystem has since grown to include Quiddity, a Big Data and research consultancy, and Actionline, a call center. The ecosystem has offices in Buenos Aires, Sao Paulo, Medellín, Miami, Mexico City and Bogotá.

Awards and Recognitions 
Darío Straschnoy was chosen as one of the men with the best reputation in the country by Merco ranking and consulting Villafañe y Asociados. In 2011, for example, he was ranked 29 and in 2013 he was the only employer in the advertising industry that integrated the ranking.	

In 1997 he won the Konex Award and was recognized as one of the top five advertisers of that decade. Ten years later, in 2007, he was part of the jury that chose the best advertisers of the past decade.

In 2011, he was part of the jury for the First Cannes Creative Effectiveness Award .

References

External links 
 The Juju's website
 Untold_'s website
 Entry in Fundación Konex

Argentine advertising executives
Living people
Year of birth missing (living people)